Hot Country Songs is a chart that ranks the top-performing country music songs in the United States, published by Billboard magazine.  In 1999, 19 different songs topped the chart, then published under the title Hot Country Singles & Tracks, in 52 issues of the magazine, based on weekly airplay data from country music radio stations compiled by Nielsen Broadcast Data Systems.

At the start of the year, the number one song on the chart was "You're Easy on the Eyes" by Terri Clark, one of seven female vocalists to top the chart during the year; during the late 1990s, female performers achieved a level of success on the country charts greater than they did in the first half of the decade or would in the next decade.  Two female vocalists achieved the first number one singles of their careers in 1999: Sara Evans with "No Place That Far" in March and Chely Wright with "Single White Female" in September, as did Mark Wills in May with "Wish You Were Here" and Brad Paisley with "He Didn't Have to Be" in December. Jo Dee Messina topped the chart in January with "Stand Beside Me", the third number one song taken from her album I'm Alright and became the first female vocalist to have multi-week runs at number one with three consecutive singles from one album since Billboard began tracking country albums in 1964.

The longest unbroken run at number one in 1999 was the eight weeks spent at the top by Lonestar's "Amazed", the lengthiest uninterrupted spell at the top of the country singles chart since David Houston had a nine-week run at number one with "Almost Persuaded" in 1966.  "Amazed" also achieved considerable crossover success, topping the magazine's all-genre singles chart, the Hot 100, the first time a country act had achieved this feat since Kenny Rogers and Dolly Parton with their duet "Islands in the Stream" in 1983.  Four other songs spent more than a month at the top of the Hot Country Singles & Tracks chart.  Kenny Chesney spent six weeks at the top with "How Forever Feels" from March to May, and Tim McGraw spent five weeks at number one with both "Please Remember Me" and "Something Like That", the latter of which was immediately followed by a five-week run by Martina McBride's "I Love You".  McGraw's total of ten weeks at number one was the highest for any act in 1999.  He, Chesney and McBride were the only acts to reach the top with more than one song during the year.  The final number one song of the year was "Breathe" by Faith Hill.

Chart history

See also
1999 in music
List of artists who reached number one on the U.S. country chart

References

1999
1999 record charts
Country